Drillia ballista is a species of sea snail, a marine gastropod mollusk in the family Drilliidae.

Description
The size of an adult shell varies between 11 mm and 22 mm. The shell is wax-yellow. It is narrowly sinuate with the anal sinus pretty deep.

Distribution
This species occurs in the demersal zone of the Atlantic Ocean off West Africa, Guinea

References

 Tucker, J.K. 2004 Catalog of recent and fossil turrids (Mollusca: Gastropoda). Zootaxa 682:1–1295

External links
 

ballista
Gastropods described in 1883